Johnson Creek is a stream in Stearns County, in the U.S. state of Minnesota.

Johnson Creek was named for L. P. Johnson, an early settler and afterward county official.

See also
List of rivers of Minnesota

References

Rivers of Stearns County, Minnesota
Rivers of Minnesota